Labidochromis chisumulae is a species of fish in the family Cichlidae. It is endemic to Chizumulu Island, Malawi.  Its natural habitat is freshwater lakes.

References

Endemic fauna of Malawi
chisumulae
Fish described in 1987
Taxonomy articles created by Polbot